Faith Band is an American rock band from Indianapolis, Indiana. Between 1973 and 1979 the group released 5 albums that were distributed throughout the United States. The group gained popularity in their hometown in 1978 with the song Dancin' Shoes. Later that year Nigel Olsson recorded a version of the song which became a Top 20 hit.

Lead singer Carl Storie and bassist Mark Cawley formed the duo Blinding Tears in 1985, and released a self titled album on Riva Records in 1986. Carl Storie released a solo album in 1999 2 Dave Bennett released a solo album Out of the Bleu in 2004.

John Cascella (born on April 29, 1947) moved on to John Mellencamp's band where he played keyboards until his untimely death on November 14, 1992, at age 45. The liner notes in the album "Human Wheels" includes a dedication to him by Mellencamp. Johnny's keyboard expertise on an amped-up Hammond B3 organ connected to an over-driven Leslie (rotary-doppler effect) speaker box was awe-inspiring.

Dave Barnes went on to work with his brother, Terry Barnes, for Ticketmaster in the mid-1980s and helped to make it one of the largest ticket sales and distribution companies in the world. The Faith Band is currently recording an album at DaddyReal studios in Indianapolis. It is set to be released sometime in 2013.

Members 
 Carl Storie (lead vocals, harmonica)
 David Bennett (electric six-string guitar)
 John Cascella (keyboards, saxophone, vocals; died 1992)
 Mark Cawley (bass guitar)
 Dave Barnes (drums)

Discography 
 Faith (1973) Brown Bag Records/United Artists 
 Excuse Me, I Just Cut an Album (1977) Village Records - VR-7703 
 Rock'n Romance (1978) Village Records - VR 7805 - distributed by Phonogram
 Face to Face (1979) Village Records/Mercury SRM 1-3770 
 Vital Signs (1979) Village Records/Mercury SRM 1-3807 
 Faith Band Legacy (internet only release 2010)

Singles
 "Dancin' Shoes" (1978) #54 Billboard Hot 100
 "You're My Weakness" (1979) #79 Billboard Hot 100

Formerly Known As 
   Formerly known as "The Chosen Few" Band - Included bass player and backup vocalist "Jack Hamilton" - www.garagehangover.com - Album Title: "The Chosen Few" - RCA Records LSP-4242 - 1969 
   Formerly Known as The "Limousine" Band - Album Title: "Limousine" - GSF Records - GFS-S-1002 - 1972

References

Musical groups from Indianapolis
Musical groups established in 1973
Rock music groups from Indiana